The Rotunde in Vienna was a building erected for the Weltausstellung 1873 Wien (the Vienna World Fair of 1873).
The building was a partially covered circular steel construction, 84 m (approx. 275 ft) in height and 108 m (approx. 354 ft) in diameter. For almost one century, it was the largest dome construction in the world, larger than the Pantheon in Rome (Not until 1957 was a larger dome built; this was the Belgrade Fair – Hall 1, and it was only 1 m larger in diameter.)

It was designed by the Austrian architect Karl Freiherr von Hasenauer and built by the German company Johann Caspar Harkort of Duisburg. The Scottish engineer for the roof was John Scott Russell, who used 4,000 tons of steel with no ties.

The central building of the World Fair was accepted enthusiastically by the public. It was used for shows and fairs later on. Alexander Girardi performed a concert in this hall. In 1898 a "Collektivausstellung österreichischer Automobilbauer" (Collective Exhibition of Austrian Carbuilders) was shown during the "Kaiser Franz Joseph Jubiläumsausstellung" (Emperor Franz Joseph Jubilee-Exhibition). The first four cars ever built in Austria-Hungary were shown there, amongst them the car built by Siegfried Marcus in 1888/89.

The Rotunde burned down in 1937. Its former location is now occupied by a portal of the Vienna International Fair.

Notes

External links 
 Rotunde (in German)

Infrastructure completed in 1873
Buildings and structures in Vienna
Buildings and structures in Leopoldstadt
World's fair architecture in Europe